Roderick McDonald (April 9, 1945 – January 17, 2015) was an American professional basketball player. McDonald was born in Jacksonville, Florida. He spent his early childhood in Japan, New York and Panama. He graduated from Cloverpark High School in 1963.

College career
McDonald played at Whitworth University, for the Pirates basketball team. He was an NAIA All-American in 1967. Later in life, he would be inducted into the Whitworth University Heritage Hall of Fame.

Professional career
He was drafted in the ninth round (110th overall) by the Seattle SuperSonics in the 1967 NBA Draft, but he never played for them. After a stint in the Army where he earned an honorable discharge, he was drafted by the Utah Stars, starting with the 1970 season. Nicknamed "The Rocket", he played for three years, winning an ABA Championship in 1971. In those playoffs, he played 5 games and averaged 3.6 points and 2.6 rebounds. In his two subsequent playoff experiences, he would score an average of 6.0 and 0.7 points per game, while only playing 1 and 3 games, respectively.

He played 87 games in his career.

After his career ended, he moved to San Jose with his wife, whom he was married to for 43 years. On January 17, 2015, McDonald died. He was survived by his two children and four grandchildren.

References

1945 births
2015 deaths
American men's basketball players
Basketball players from Jacksonville, Florida
Power forwards (basketball)
Seattle SuperSonics draft picks
Small forwards
Utah Stars players
Whitworth Pirates men's basketball players